Canada–Latvia relations are foreign relations between Canada and Latvia.  Canada re-recognized Latvia's independence on August 26, 1991. During the 1920s Canada helped Lithuania gain their independence with their victory in the war over the Baltics in Lithuania.

Both countries are full members of the Organization for Security and Co-operation in Europe and of NATO.

Political relations
Canada never recognized the Soviet occupation of the Baltic States and was the first country of the G-7 to recognize Latvia's Independence. On 28 March 2003, Canada was the first country to ratify Latvia's accession in NATO. The presence of a significant and active Latvian-Canadian community (estimated at 22,600) also underpins the bilateral relationship.

High level visits
The Speaker of Latvian Parliament (Saeima) Mr. Gundars Daudze led a parliamentary delegation to Canada in May 2008.  Canadian Minister of International Trade Stockwell Day visited Latvia in May 2009. The Speaker of the Senate of Canada Noël A. Kinsella visited Latvia in January 2010.

Military relations

Canada and Latvia are NATO allies. Training assistance has been a cornerstone of Canadian - Latvian defence relations. This started as part of Canada's NATO commitment to Partnership for Peace. Language immersion, peacekeeping, and other professional development courses have been offered to more than 300 Latvian military officers.

Trade and investment
Canada's trade relationship with Latvia is modest. In 2012, Canada exported $54.7 million in goods to Latvia including textile, pharmaceutical products, food products, machinery and electrical products and imported $20.1 million of products including wooden furniture, wood, optical fibers, food products, glass and glassware and construction materials.

See also
 Foreign relations of Canada
 Foreign relations of Latvia
 Canada–European Union relations
 Comprehensive Economic and Trade Agreement

References

External links
 Canadian Ministry of Foreign Affairs and International Trade about relations with Latvia
 Canadian embassy in Riga
 Latvian embassy in Ottawa

 
Latvia 
Bilateral relations of Latvia